Byrd Field may refer to:

 Byrd Field, the name of Old Byrd Stadium, the playing field for the University of Maryland from 1923 until 1947.
 Byrd Field, an earlier name for Richmond International Airport.